Wincentów may refer to the following places:
Wincentów, Krasnystaw County in Lublin Voivodeship (east Poland)
Wincentów, Lubartów County in Lublin Voivodeship (east Poland)
Wincentów, Bełchatów County in Łódź Voivodeship (central Poland)
Wincentów, Łask County in Łódź Voivodeship (central Poland)
Wincentów, Kielce County in Świętokrzyskie Voivodeship (south-central Poland)
Wincentów, Końskie County in Świętokrzyskie Voivodeship (south-central Poland)
Wincentów, Włoszczowa County in Świętokrzyskie Voivodeship (south-central Poland)
Wincentów, Lipsko County in Masovian Voivodeship (east-central Poland)
Wincentów, Piaseczno County in Masovian Voivodeship (east-central Poland)
Wincentów, Płock County in Masovian Voivodeship (east-central Poland)
Wincentów, Radom County in Masovian Voivodeship (east-central Poland)
Wincentów, Zwoleń County in Masovian Voivodeship (east-central Poland)
Wincentów, Żyrardów County in Masovian Voivodeship (east-central Poland)
Wincentów, Greater Poland Voivodeship (west-central Poland)